Pavement may refer to:

 Pavement (architecture), an outdoor floor or superficial surface covering
 Road surface, the durable surfacing of roads and walkways
 Asphalt concrete, a common form of road surface
 Sidewalk or pavement, a walkway along the side of a road
 Cool pavement, is pavement that delivers higher solar reflectance than conventional dark pavement.
 Pavement (York), a street in York, in England

Geology
 Limestone pavement, a naturally occurring landform that resembles an artificial pavement
 Desert pavement, a desert ground surface covered with closely packed rock fragments of pebble and cobble size
 Tessellated pavement, a rare sedimentary rock formation that occurs on some ocean shores
 Glacial striation or glacial pavement, a rock surface scoured and polished by glacial action

Arts and entertainment
 Pavement (band), an indie rock band from Stockton, California, US
 Pavement (magazine), a youth culture magazine
 "Pavement" (Space Ghost Coast to Coast), a television episode

See also
 Portuguese pavement, the traditional paving used in most pedestrian areas in Portugal
 
 
 Pave (disambiguation)
 PAVE, a United States military electronic system program